Oakwood Lake Amphitheatre was an outdoor amphitheater located at the Manteca Waterslides resort in Manteca, California. Notable past performers include Steppenwolf, Dio, Night Ranger, Mr. Big, Winger, Don Williams and Y&T.

References

Amphitheaters in California
Buildings and structures in San Joaquin County, California
Tourist attractions in San Joaquin County, California